The Ras Nungwi (also known as Hog Point) is located at the northern tip of Unguja island in Nungwi, Zanzibar, Tanzania. The lighthouse is the oldest lighthouses on the island and is a three-stage square stone tower, painted white.

See also

 List of lighthouses in Tanzania

References

External links 
 Close Up Photo of Tower
 Tanzania Ports Authority

Lighthouses in Tanzania
Lighthouses completed in 1926
Buildings and structures in Zanzibar